The Weoley local council ward is one of the 40 electoral wards for the City of Birmingham, England. It is also one of the four wards that make up the local council constituency of Birmingham Northfield, the other three being the wards of Northfield, Longbridge and King's Norton.

Ward Description
The ward covers an area of west Birmingham. It is predominantly based upon the Weoley Castle area of Birmingham. Other communities within Weoley are Allens Cross, Weoley Hill, Middle Park Farm and Spicelands Road.

Ward Demographics (from the census of 2011)
The 2011 Population Census recorded that there were 25,925 people living in the ward. Eighty per cent (20,744) of the ward's population are of white ethnicity, compared with 57.9% for Birmingham.

Ward history
The Ward was created in May 1950 as a result of the boundary changes of that year. The boundaries have been changed on a number of occasions since then.

Parliamentary Representation
The ward has been part of Birmingham Northfield constituency since 1950, which has been represented by Gary Sambrook of the (Conservative Party (United Kingdom)) since he was elected on 12 December 2019.

Politics
As of 2017, the Ward is served by three councillors on Birmingham City Council: Conservative Peter Douglas Osborn, and two Labour Party councillors: Steve Booton and Julie Johnson.

Election results

Elections in the 2010s

Elections in the 2000s

Elections in the 1950s

See also
Birmingham City Council elections

References

Notes

Bibliography

External links
 Birmingham City Council: Weoley Ward

Former wards of Birmingham, West Midlands
Northfield Constituency